Intelsat 906 (or IS-906) is a communications satellite operated by Intelsat.

Launch 
Intelsat 906 was launched by an Ariane 4 rocket from Guiana Space Centre, French Guiana, at 06:44 UTC on September 6, 2002.

Capacity and coverage 
It will broadcasting, business services, direct-to-home TV broadcasting, telecommunications and VSAT networks to Europe, Asia, and Australia through its 72 C band 22 Ku band transponders after parking over 64 degrees east longitude. It displaces Intelsat 804 which will then be moved to 176 degrees east to handle the increased cross-Atlantic demand.

See also 
 2002 in spaceflight

External links 
 . Intelsat

References 

Intelsat satellites